Tauama Timoti (born 23 February 1959) is a weightlifter from American Samoa.

Timoti competed at the 1988 Summer Olympics in the heavyweight class, he finished 16th out of the 20 starters.

References

External links
 

1959 births
Living people
American Samoan male weightlifters
American people of Samoan descent
Olympic weightlifters of American Samoa
Weightlifters at the 1988 Summer Olympics